Theta Muscae (θ Muscae) is a multiple star system in the southern constellation Musca ("the Fly"), containing a Wolf-Rayet star and two massive companions.  With an apparent magnitude of 5.5, it is the second-brightest Wolf–Rayet star in the sky, although much of the visual brightness comes from the massive companions and it is not one of the closest of its type.

Description
Theta Muscae is a remote triple star system, the primary component of which is a carbon-sequence Wolf–Rayet star. This is a variety of highly-luminous hot blue star that has blown off its hydrogen envelope and is emitting heavier elements, in this case carbon, amid a strong stellar wind. Theta Muscae is the second-brightest such star in the sky after Gamma Velorum in Vela. θ Mus is beyond the current reach of useful visual parallax measurements, but has been estimated as around 7,400 light-years (460 million astronomical units) from Earth. While cataloging the stars in the far-southern sky, French explorer and astronomer Nicolas-Louis de Lacaille gave the star its Bayer designation in 1756.

Triple system
The triple star θ Muscae A is composed of two parts: a spectroscopic binary system composed of the Wolf–Rayet star (spectral type: WC5 or 6) and an O-type main-sequence star (spectral type: O6 or O7) that orbit each other every 19 days and a blue supergiant (spectral type: O9.5/B0Iab) set about 46 milliarcseconds apart from them. If the system's estimated distance from Earth is accurate, the binary stars are about 0.5 AU apart and the supergiant about 100 AU apart from them.  Although the Wolf–Rayet star dominates the spectrum, it is visually only about a quarter of the brightness of the supergiant companion. All three are highly luminous: combined, they are likely to be over a million times as luminous as the Sun. The stellar winds of the Wolf–Rayet star and its close companion are so powerful that they form a shock front where they meet. The front produces X-rays.

Nebula
A surrounding emission nebula is now thought to be a supernova remnant, not directly connected to θ Muscae.

References

Musca (constellation)
Muscae, Theta
Wolf–Rayet stars
Triple star systems
O-type main-sequence stars
O-type supergiants
064094
113904
4952
Durchmusterung objects
O-type giants
IRAS catalogue objects